Erick Thohir (born 30 May 1970) is an Indonesian businessman and politician who has served as Indonesia's Minister of State Owned Enterprises since 2019 and chairman of Football Association of Indonesia since 2023. He is the founder of Mahaka Group, a conglomeration that focuses on media, sports and entertainment. Globally known as the former owner and chairman of Italian football giant Inter Milan and US soccer club D.C. United, Thohir is currently co-owner alongside Anindya Bakrie of English League One team Oxford United and Liga 1 outfit Persis Solo along with Kaesang Pangarep, the youngest son of President Joko Widodo. He was also the president director of ANTV television station and the chief of the Indonesian Olympic Committee. In 2019, he became a member of the International Olympic Committee (IOC).

Early and personal life
Erick Thohir was born on 30 May 1970. His father, Teddy Thohir, was a co-owner of the automotive group Astra International with William Soeryadjaya. He has a brother and a sister. 

Thohir received his master's degree in 1993 from National University (California), United States.

Career
Upon his return to Indonesia, together with his colleagues, he formed the Mahaka Group.

In 2001, the Mahaka Group bought Republika, the biggest Islamic newspaper in Indonesia. Because of Thohir's background in communications, he was chosen to lead the paper. He received support from his father, as well as founder of Kompas Jakob Oetama and founder of Jawa Pos Dahlan Iskan to run this newspaper. The Mahaka Group spread its potential by investing in the outdoor advertising company Mahaka Advertising due to the growth of the economic and the city size in 2002.

After launching the television station Jak TV, Mahaka introduced the radio stations 98.7 Gen FM and 101 Jak FM, and participated in PT Radionet Cipta Karya (Prambors FM, Delta FM and FeMale Radio), as well as numerous advertising, ticketing, entertainment and digital companies.

Thohir is the founder of Darma Bakti Mahaka Foundation.

In 2011, together with Anindya Bakrie he co-owned the television stations tvOne, as well as the internet news site Viva News. In 2014, he was involved in a turnaround project and became the President Director of ANTV.

In 2018, incumbent president Joko Widodo picked Thohir as chief of his re-election campaign for the 2019 presidential election.

In 2019, among 10 other individuals Thohir was appointed to the International Olympic Committee.

In February 2023, Thohir was elected as the new chairman of the Football Association of Indonesia.

Sports team ownership
After negotiations started after the 2011 NBA All-Star Game with former basketball agent Jason Levien and managing owner Joshua Harris, Thohir became part of the consortia that bought the Philadelphia 76ers. The consortia included actor Will Smith, his wife Jada Pinkett Smith, David S. Blitzer, of the private equity firm Blackstone Group and Indonesian businessman Handy Soetedjo. Comcast-Spectacor and Harris began talks in the summer of 2011. The deal was announced on 13 July 2011.

In addition to his business, Thohir also owns the basketball team, Satria Muda, and served as an honorary board member of the Indonesian Basketball Association (PERBASI / Persatuan Bola Basket Seluruh Indonesia) from 2015 to 2019. He has been President of SEABA (Southeast Asian Basketball Association) since 2006. He was a FIBA board member, Chef De Mission of Indonesia Contingent for the Olympic Games London 2012, and Chairman of National Olympic Committee for 2015–2019.

Basketball clubs
  Philadelphia 76ers (formerly, until 2013)
  Satria Muda

Football clubs
  D.C. United (formerly, until 2018)
  Inter Milan (formerly, until 2019)
  Oxford United (with Anindya Bakrie)
  Persis Solo (with Kaesang Pangarep)

See also 
 Mahaka Media
 Jak TV
 2018 Asian Games

References

External links

 Official website of PT. Mahaka Media Group
 Official website of antv
 Official website of Satria Muda Basketball
 
 

Living people
1970 births
People from Jakarta
D.C. United owners
Philadelphia 76ers executives
Indonesian Muslims
Indonesian businesspeople
Indonesian billionaires
Indonesian people of Chinese descent
Sundanese people
Lampung people
Indonesian socialites
Indonesian football chairmen and investors
Inter Milan chairmen and investors
Government ministers of Indonesia
Onward Indonesia Cabinet
International Olympic Committee members
Chairmen and investors of soccer clubs in the United States
Oxford United F.C. chairmen and investors